The gens Matinia was a minor plebeian family at Rome.  Its most famous member may have been Publius Matinius, a money-broker in the time of Cicero.

Members
 Publius Matinius, a money-broker, was recommended to Cicero by Marcus Junius Brutus in 51 BC, when Cicero was proconsul in Cilicia.  Together with Marcus Scaptius, a client of Brutus, Matinius had loaned a considerable amount to the people of Salamis.
 Titus Matinius T. f. Hymenaeus, named in an inscription found near the abbey of San Pietro at Ferentillo in Umbria.

Footnotes

See also
 List of Roman gentes

References

Bibliography
 Marcus Tullius Cicero, Epistulae ad Atticum.
 Theodor Mommsen et alii, Corpus Inscriptionum Latinarum (The Body of Latin Inscriptions, abbreviated CIL), Berlin-Brandenburgische Akademie der Wissenschaften (1853–present).

Roman gentes